The Sydney Morning Herald Best Young Australian Novelists award was created in 1997 by the newspaper's literary editor, Susan Wyndham and is made annually. The awards recognise emerging writing talent, and are made to writers who are aged 35 years or younger when their book is first published.

The award criteria were relaxed in 2009 to allow the inclusion of short story collections. That year, Nam Le won the award with his short story collection, The Boat.

The judges change regularly, and the number of novelists named as "Best Young Australian Novelist" each year varies. Ten were named in the Award's first year.

Past winners
2022

 Ella Baxter, New Animal
 Michael Burrows, Where the Line Breaks
 Diana Reid, Love and Virtue

2021

 Vivian Pham, The Coconut Children
 Jessie Tu, A Lonely Girl is a Dangerous Thing
 K.M. (Kate) Kruimink,  Treacherous Country

2020

 Alice Bishop, A Constant Hum
 Joey Bui, Lucky Ticket
 Josephine Rowe, Here Until August

2019

Robbie Arnott, Flames
Tom Lee, Coach Fitz
Jamie Marina Lau, Pink Mountain on Locust Island
Ruby J. Murray, The Biographer's Lover
2018
Jennifer Down, Pulse Points
Marija Pericic, The Lost Pages
Shaun Prescott, The Town
Pip Smith, Half Wild
2017
Rajith Savandasa, Ruins
Jennifer Down, The Magic Hour
Julie Koh, Portable Curiosities
Josephine Rowe, A Loving, Faithful Animal
2016
Murray Middleton, When There's Nowhere Left to Run
Abigail Ulman, Hot Little Hands
2015
Michael Mohammed Ahmad, The Tribe
Ellen van Neerven, Heat and Light
Maxine Beneba Clarke, Foreign Soil
Omar Musa, Here Come the Dogs
Alice Pung, Laurinda
2014
Luke Carman, An Elegant Man
Balli Kaur Jaswal, Inheritance
Hannah Kent, Burial Rites 
Fiona McFarlane, The Night Guest
2013
Romy Ash, Floundering
Paul D. Carter, Eleven Seasons
Zane Lovitt, The Midnight Promise
Emily Maguire, Fishing for Tigers
Ruby J. Murray, Running Dogs
Majok Tulba, Beneath the Darkening Sky
2012
Melanie Joosten, Berlin Syndrome
Jennifer Mills, Gone
Rohan Wilson, The Roving Party
2011
Lisa Lang, Utopian Man
Gretchen Shirm, Having Cried Wolf
Kristel Thornell, Night Street
2010
Kalinda Ashton, The Danger Game
Andrew Croome, Document Z
Emily Maguire, Smoke in the Room
Craig Silvey, Jasper Jones
2009
Nam Le, The Boat
Alice Nelson, The Last Sky
Kevin Rabalais, The Landscape of Desire
Steve Toltz, A Fraction of the Whole
2008
Belinda Castles, The River Baptists
Max Barry, Company
Jessica Davidson, What Does Blue Feel Like?
Jessica White, A Curious Intimacy
2007
Will Elliott, The Pilo Family Circus
Tara June Winch, Swallow the Air
Danielle Wood, Rosie Little's Cautionary Tales for Girls
2006
Stephanie Bishop, The Singing
Leigh Redhead, Rubdown
Tony Wilson, Players
Markus Zusak, The Book Thief
2005
Nicholas Angel, Drown Them in the Sea
Corrie Hosking, Ash Rain
Andrew Humphreys, Wonderful
Leigh Redhead, Peepshow
Craig Silvey, Rhubarb
2004
M.J. Hyland, How the Light Gets In
Louise Limerick, Dying for Cake
Mardi McConnochie, The Snow Queen
Nerida Newton, The Lambing Flat
Matthew Reilly, Scarecrow
Danielle Wood, The Alphabet of Light and Dark
2003
Emily Ballou, Father Lands
Sonya Hartnett, Of a Boy
Sarah Hay, Skins
Chloe Hooper, A Child's Book of True Crime
2002
Tegan Bennett Daylight, What Falls Away
Stephen Gray, The Artist Is a Thief
Andrew Humphreys, The Weight of the Sun
Irini Savvides, Willow Tree and Olive
2001
Sonya Hartnett, Thursday's Child
Malcolm Knox, Summerland
Hoa Pham, Vixen
2000
James Bradley, The Deep Field
Julia Leigh, The Hunter
1999
Georgia Blain, Closed for Winter
Bernard Cohen, Snowdome
Raimondo Cortese, The Indestructible Corpse
Lisa Merrifield, Mrs Feather and the Aesthetics of Survival
Camilla Nelson, Perverse Acts
Elliot Perlman, Three Dollars
1998
James Bradley, Wrack
Bernard Cohen, The Blindman's Hat
Luke Davies, Candy
Delia Falconer, The Service of Clouds
Anthony Macris, Capital: Volume One
Clare Mendes, A Race Across Burning Soil
David Snell, The Illustrated Family Doctor
Emma Tom, Deadset
1997
Bernard Cohen, Tourism
Matthew Condon, The Lulu Magnet
Fotini Epanomitis, The Mule's Foal
Catherine Ford, Dirt and Other Stories
Andrew McGahan, 1988
Fiona McGregor, Suck My Toes
Gillian Mears, The Grass Sister
Mandy Sayer, Mood Indigo]]
Christos Tsiolkas, LoadedBeth Yahp, The Crocodile Fury''

References

Awards established in 1997
1997 establishments in Australia
Australian fiction awards